Paul Douglas Richan (born March 26, 1997) is an American professional baseball pitcher who is a free agent.

Amateur career
Richan attended Hart High School in Santa Clarita, California. In 2015, his senior year, he went 5–2 with a 1.65 ERA and 71 strikeouts. Undrafted in the 2015 Major League Baseball draft, he enrolled at the University of San Diego (USD) where he played college baseball.

In 2016, as a freshman at USD, Richan appeared in 13 games (making one start), pitching to a 1–1 record with an 8.88 ERA with twenty strikeouts over 24 innings. As a sophomore in 2017, he pitched in 18 games (11 starts), going 5–2 with a 3.05 ERA, earning All-West Coast Conference Honorable Mention. In 2018, his junior season, Richan transitioned into a full-time starter, pitching to a 4–6 record with a 4.62 ERA across 13 starts, striking out 101 in  innings.

Professional career
After his junior year at USD, Richan was selected by the Chicago Cubs in the second round (78th overall) of the 2018 Major League Baseball draft. Richan signed with the Cubs and made his professional debut with the Eugene Emeralds. Over ten games (nine starts), he went 0–2 with a 2.12 ERA, striking out 31 and walking only five across  innings. In 2019, he began the year with the Myrtle Beach Pelicans with whom he was named a Florida State League All-Star.

On July 31, 2019, Richan was traded along with Alex Lange to the Detroit Tigers in exchange for Nicholas Castellanos. He was assigned to the Lakeland Flying Tigers, and finished the season there. Over 22 starts between Myrtle Beach and Lakeland, Richan pitched to a 12–7 record and a 4.00 ERA, striking out 115 over  innings. He did not play a minor league game in 2020 due to the cancellation of the minor league season caused by the COVID-19 pandemic. To begin the 2021 season, he was assigned to the Erie SeaWolves. In late June, he was placed on the injured list and missed the rest of the season. Over eight starts, he compiled a 3.72 ERA and 26 strikeouts over 29 innings. On May 20, 2022, the Tigers released Richan.

References

External links

1997 births
Living people
Baseball pitchers
Baseball players from California
Eugene Emeralds players
Lakeland Flying Tigers players
Myrtle Beach Pelicans players
People from Newhall, Santa Clarita, California
San Diego Toreros baseball players
Sportspeople from Los Angeles County, California